The 25th San Diego Film Critics Society Awards were announced on January 11, 2021. The nominations were announced on January 8, 2021, with Sound of Metal leading the nominations with eight.

Winners and nominees
Winners are listed at the top of each list in bold, while the runner-ups and nominees for each category are listed under them.

References

External links
 Official Site

2020
2020 film awards
2020 in American cinema